The 1902–03 Manitoba Hockey Association (MHA) season consisted of a six game series between the Winnipeg Rowing Club and the Winnipeg Victorias. To differentiate from the Manitoba & Northwestern Hockey Association, the league was known as the Western Canada Hockey Association. The Rowing Club won the series of the Winnipeg teams to take the championship. The Rowing Club would challenge for the Stanley Cup in the 1903–04 season.

Regular season

Highlights

Final standing

Source: Zweig 2012

See also
 List of Stanley Cup champions

References

 

Notes

Manitoba Hockey Association seasons
Man